By the Sea is a 2015 American romantic drama film written and directed by Angelina Jolie (credited as Angelina Jolie Pitt), and produced by and starring Jolie and Brad Pitt. Shot in August 2014 during Pitt and Jolie's honeymoon in Gozo, Malta, the film was released by Universal Pictures on November 13, 2015.

The film received mixed reviews and did not do well at the box office, grossing just $3.3 million against its $10 million budget.

Plot
In the 1960s, in France, an American couple, former dancer Vanessa and her husband Roland, a successful writer, have been married for 14 years. They drive to a coastal hotel. Roland wants to write a story while staying there. The two are barely on speaking terms; Vanessa is withdrawn and grieving for an unknown reason. Roland appears to drink too much and seems unhappy that Vanessa is no longer interested in him sexually.

Roland becomes friendly with the local cafe owner, an older man still grieving his much-loved late wife, but who carries on, cheerfully accepting what life has given him. Vanessa watches a local fisherman who goes out every day on the outgoing tide and returns on the incoming one, catching few fish, but contented.

Vanessa and Roland strike up a friendship with an attractive young couple staying in the room next to them. Soon after, they discover that the wall between their two rooms has a disused radiator pipe hole, enabling them to watch the couple in their bedroom talking and having sex.

Gradually their experiences at the hotel enable Vanessa and Roland to start patching up their relationship. However, Vanessa attempts a liaison with the young husband in the next room, interrupted violently by Roland, who has been watching through the wall. He bruises the husband, who must later explain to his wife and does so truthfully, seriously damaging the relationship between the young couple. This also triggers a confrontation between Vanessa and Roland, during which he tells her that if she wishes to hurt him, she should just go ahead and hurt him physically. Roland asserts that her seduction of the husband was motivated by his wife's envy of the young couple - particularly of their ability to bear children. Roland physically restrains Vanessa against a wall and makes her speak of herself being barren which they haven't been able to talk about. After a short struggle, Vanessa breaks down and weeps for her loss. Later, Roland explains to the young wife that two miscarriages caused Vanessa's lasting grief, withdrawal and behavior toward her husband.

Having finally come to terms with their life together, Vanessa seems able to go on and Roland is able to finish writing a new book. It seems also that the young couple next door may be able to work their way through the episode as well, and come out stronger on the other side.

As Vanessa and Roland leave the hotel and drive away, they appear to be reconciled.

Cast
 Brad Pitt as Roland
 Angelina Jolie Pitt as Vanessa
 Mélanie Laurent as Léa
 Niels Arestrup as Michel
 Melvil Poupaud as François
 Richard Bohringer as Patrice

Production
In May 2014, it was announced that Angelina Jolie would co-star with Brad Pitt in a film titled By the Sea, to be written and directed by Jolie. The Hollywood Reporter speculated it would be a relationship drama that Jolie wrote several years ago, centering on a couple with issues who take a vacation in a last-ditch effort to save their marriage.

This was the first cinematic collaboration between the two since Mr. & Mrs. Smith (2005). Prime Minister Joseph Muscat of Malta confirmed the project, stating that it would be partially filmed at Mġarr ix-Xini.

Jolie stated that the film "at its core, is about grief" further noting that the loss of her mother in 2007 caused a great deal of sadness for her. To that end, the movie resembles movies of the 1960s and '70s; Jolie stated that her mother "loved films of that period".  Christian Berger is the cinematographer; he used mostly natural light throughout filming, while Jon Hutman is the production designer. Principal photography and production began on August 19, 2014, in Gozo, Malta, and ended on November 10, 2014.

Release
In May 2015, the film was slated for a November 13, 2015 release.

Marketing and promotion
Stills from the film were released on September 15, 2014. On August 6, 2015, a teaser trailer for the film was released.

Home media
By the Sea was released on DVD & Blu-ray in Australia and Germany on June 9, 2016, in the United Kingdom on June 20, 2016, and in Canada and the United States on July 5, 2016.

Reception

Box office
By the Sea opened theatrically in ten venues, earning $96,250, ranking number 38 in the domestic box office. As of December 10, the film has grossed $538,460 in the United States and Canada, and $2,796,467 overseas for a worldwide total of $3,334,927.

Critical response
On Rotten Tomatoes, the film has a rating of 34%, based on 135 reviews, with an average rating of 4.8/10. The site's consensus reads, "By the Sea may intrigue celebrity voyeurs or fans of a certain type of arthouse cinema, but for most viewers, its beauty won't be enough to offset its narrative inertia." On Metacritic, the film has a score of 44 out of 100, based on 35 critics, indicating "mixed or average reviews".

Justin Chang, chief film critic for Variety said: "By the Sea always offers something to tickle the eye and ear, even as it leaves the heart and mind coolly unstirred."

References

External links
 
 
 
 

2015 films
2015 romantic drama films
American romantic drama films
Films about writers
Films directed by Angelina Jolie
Films produced by Angelina Jolie
Films produced by Brad Pitt
Films set in France
Films set in the 1970s
Films shot in Malta
Plan B Entertainment films
Films with screenplays by Angelina Jolie
Universal Pictures films
2010s English-language films
2010s American films